was a Japanese samurai daimyō of the Muromachi period. 
 
He was shugo or military governor of Echigo Province.

See also
 Uesugi clan

References

Daimyo
1478 births
1550 deaths
Uesugi clan